The 2009 McDonald's Burnie International was a professional tennis tournament played on outdoor hard courts. It was the 7th edition of the tournament, and part of the 2009 ATP Challenger Tour. For the first time the tournament also hosted Women's Singles and Women's Doubles events as part of the 2009 ITF Women's Circuit. It took place in Burnie, Australia, between 2 and 8 February 2009.

Singles main-draw entrants

Seeds

 Rankings are as of 19 January 2009

Other entrants
The following players received wildcards into the singles main draw:
  Brendan McKenzie
  John Millman
  Matt Reid
  Bernard Tomic

The following players received entry from the qualifying draw:
  Kaden Hensel
  Adam Hubble
  Sadik Kadir
  Dane Propoggia

Champions

Men's singles

 Brydan Klein def.  Grega Žemlja, 6–3, 6–3

Men's doubles

 Miles Armstrong /  Sadik Kadir def.  Peter Luczak /  Robert Smeets, 6–3, 3–6, [10–7]

Women's singles

 Abigail Spears def.  Lu Jingjing, 6–4 6–2

Women's doubles

 Abigail Spears /  Monique Adamczak def.  Xu Yifan /  Zhou Yimiao 6–2 6–4

External links

2009 ATP Challenger Tour
2009 in Australian tennis
2009 McDonald's Burnie International